The Cessna CR-3 was a follow on racing aircraft to the Cessna CR-2 that raced in the 1932 National Air Races.

Development
The CR-3 was ordered by air racer Johnny Livingston in response to the performance he saw when competing against the Cessna CR-2 in the 1932 National Air Races. The CR-3 was of shoulder-wing design.

Design
The CR-3 was a mid-wing radial engined taildragger racer with manual retractable landing gear and a tail skid. The propeller was from a clipped wing Monocoupe racer #14. The tail surface was designed to be neutral, without downforce in flight. The elevators experienced significant vibration in test flights without the wing root fairings installed.

Operational history

The CR-3 lasted 61 days, winning every event it competed in:

Omaha Air Races at Omaha, Nebraska, June 17, 1933: First place.
Minneapolis Air Races and Minneapolis, Minnesota, June 24, 1933: First place.
American Air Races at Chicago, Illinois, July 1, 1933: The CR-3 first raced against Cessna CR-2 at these races. The CR-3 won the Baby Ruth Trophy at a speed of 201.42 mph (324.35 km/hr). It also set a world speed record for aircraft with engines of under 500-cubic-inches′ (8.2 liters′) capacity at 237.4 mph (382.3 km/hr).
Aero Digest Trophy race, July 4, 1933: First place.

En route to an airshow in August 1933, the CR-3 experienced a failure of both the tail skid and a landing gear weld that would not allow the gear to lock. Livingston bailed out over Columbus, Ohio and the CR-3 was destroyed in its ensuing crash.

Specifications

See also

References

CR-03
1930s United States sport aircraft
Single-engined tractor aircraft
High-wing aircraft
Racing aircraft
Aircraft first flown in 1933
Retractable conventional landing gear